"Defying Gravity" is the signature song from the musical Wicked, composed by Stephen Schwartz, originally recorded by Idina Menzel and Kristin Chenoweth on November 10, 2003, and released on December 16, 2003.  It is mostly a solo sung by the main character of the show, Elphaba (the Wicked Witch of the West), with two small duets at the beginning and in the middle of the song between Elphaba and her friend Glinda, and a chorus part at the end in which the citizens of Oz sing.

Development 
The song was composed by Stephen Schwartz, and first performed in October 2003.

Context and sequence
In Wicked, the song is the finale for the show's first act, when Elphaba discovers that The Wizard of Oz is not the heroic figure she had originally believed him to be.  Realizing this, and despite Glinda's attempts to dissuade her, Elphaba vows to do everything in her power to fight the Wizard and his sinister plans against the Animals of Oz.  She sings of how she wants to live without limits, going against the rules that others have set for her. During the song, Elphaba enchants a broomstick to levitate and, pursued by the Wizard's guards, rises from the stage above the angered citizens of Oz, who try in vain to "bring her down." The song is heavily cinematic and comes to a climax for the final verse.  The staging of this climax in the original production featured several special effects. The actress playing Elphaba was lifted up into the air by a hydraulic launch system. The sequence relied heavily on around 60 moving lights, smoke, and wind effects.

In case of a lift malfunction in which Elphaba is not lifted up into the air, cast members were taught  a "Plan B" or "no-fly" sequence where  Elphaba runs downstage and cast playing the guards and townspeople lie down onstage to simulate looking up to a now airborne Elphaba.

The Act One finale is "calibrated to get everyone to stick around for Act Two".

Lyrics and music analysis 
The core to the song is that "Elphaba finds power through her own outsider status", which has universal appeal due to audiences rooting for outsiders. The piece begins with Elphaba and Glinda talking, then they slip into song, bickering in short sharp phrases that are reminiscent of how girls would argue in real life. At this point, the key signature is constantly shifting, creating a sense of unease. The song is in cut common time, but the duo rarely stick to the bar lines, often jumping in half way in a syncopated style. In the passage “I’m through with playing by the rules...", the song unusually contains an 11th interval.

The song builds on leitmotifs established earlier in the show, and then "raises the stakes" by lifting her voice up an octave and physically lifting her up on a cherry picker, embodying the first time the audience sees her as The Wicked Witch of the West. The dramatic conclusion of the song features a "loud, screamy" climax of “bring me down” followed by a vocal riff that, according to Vulture, has the potential to destroy the performer's vocal cords. Due to the song's difficulty, it is achievable for a few and impossible for most, thereby making those who succeed outsiders by default.

Critical reception 
Vulture listed the number as the best song from Wicked, deeming it the "crown jewel of the score", though noted it is an easy song to mock due to it being "ripe for acrid belting and silly embellishment". Vulture also described it as the "big, belt-y centerpiece of the show", and felt it had since established an "ambivalent legacy" as the "silliest, most inspiring, most enduring song in recent Broadway history".

Legacy 
In the original production occasionally the cherry-picker tech did not work, leading to "infamous and hilarious 'no-fly' shows". The song was used to wake up astronauts aboard space shuttle mission STS-131 in April 2010 for astronaut Dorothy Metcalf-Lindenburger in honor of the day's planned extra-vehicular activity.

Defying Gravity is featured in the Glee episode Wheels, where Rachel (Lea Michele) and Kurt (Chris Colfer) sing it separately in a competition for the lead solo. This plotline was inspired by an anecdote of Chris Colfer, the actor playing Kurt. Having a countertenor range, Colfer wanted to sing the song in talent shows in high school, but was repeatedly denied the chance during high school as it is a solo usually reserved for female artists. It was featured again in the season five episode 100, the hundredth episode in the series, this time sung by Rachel, Kurt and Mercedes (Amber Riley).

Certifications

Idina Menzel single

Idina Menzel, having reprised her role as Elphaba in the London production of Wicked in 2006, recorded a remixed "pop mainstream" version of the song. It was released as a single on March 1, 2007, and was later included on the UK and iTunes versions of her 2008 album I Stand. The remix of "Defying Gravity" was also the anthem at the 2007 Gay Pride Parade and Festival in Los Angeles, and appears on the official CD from the event. The track charted at no. 60 on the official UK Singles chart in May 2008, shortly after a contestant sang "Defying Gravity" on an episode of the BBC television programme I'd Do Anything.
She released the song as a single a second time in 2012 from her album Live: Barefoot at the Symphony.

Formats and track listings
US CD single
 "Defying Gravity" (Tracy Young's Flying Monkey's Club Mix) – 8:02
 "Defying Gravity" (Eddie Baez Club Mix) – 8:42
 "Defying Gravity" (Hani Flying So High Club Mix) – 7:04
 "Defying Gravity" (Josh Harris Vocal Club Mix) – 7:16
 "Defying Gravity" (Funky Junction & Antony Reale Club Mix) – 6:22
 "Defying Gravity" (Single version) – 3:48

Digital single
 "Defying Gravity" (Album version) – 3:46

Digital maxi single
 "Defying Gravity" (Tracy Young's Flying Monkey's Radio Edit) – 3:45
 "Defying Gravity" (Eddie Baez Radio Edit) – 4:54
 "Defying Gravity" (Funky Junction & Antony Reale Radio Edit) – 4:36
 "Defying Gravity" (Hani Flying So High Short Mix) – 4:55
 "Defying Gravity" (Josh Harris Radio Edit) – 3:53

Digital maxi single (DJ version)
 "Defying Gravity" (Tracy Young's Flying Monkey's Club Mix) – 8:02
 "Defying Gravity" (Eddie Baez Club Mix) – 8:42
 "Defying Gravity" (Funky Junction & Antony Reale Club Mix) – 6:22
 "Defying Gravity" (Hani Flying So High Club Mix) – 7:04
 "Defying Gravity" (Josh Harris Vocal Club Mix) – 7:16

Official versions
 "Defying Gravity" (Album version) – 3:46
 "Defying Gravity" (Single version) – 3:48
 "Defying Gravity" (Eddie Baez Club Mix) – 8:42
 "Defying Gravity" (Eddie Baez Radio Edit) – 4:54
 "Defying Gravity" (Funky Junction & Antony Reale Club Mix) – 6:22
 "Defying Gravity" (Funky Junction & Antony Reale Radio Edit) – 4:36
 "Defying Gravity" (Hani Flying So High Club Mix) – 7:04
 "Defying Gravity" (Hani Flying So High Short Mix) – 4:55
 "Defying Gravity" (Josh Harris Vocal Club Mix) – 7:16
 "Defying Gravity" (Josh Harris Radio Edit) – 3:53
 "Defying Gravity" (Tracy Young's Flying Monkey's Club Mix) – 8:02
 "Defying Gravity" (Tracy Young's Flying Monkey's Radio Edit) – 3:45
 "Defying Gravity" (Live from Soundstage) – 3:56

Chart performance

International Wicked recordings

See also
Wicked
Wicked: The Life and Times of the Wicked Witch of the West
 Broadway theatre
 West End theatre
 Stephen Schwartz

References

External links
Official YouTube videos: Kerry Ellis performing Brian May arrangement, Brian May and Kerry Ellis (live)
Wicked Lyrics - "Defying Gravity" and composer's comments
Secret to Flying 

2003 songs
2007 singles
2000s ballads
Pop ballads
Idina Menzel songs
Kristin Chenoweth songs
Kerry Ellis songs
Songs from Wicked (musical)
Songs written by Stephen Schwartz (composer)
Songs about witches